Badachyovo is a village in Vesyegonsky District of Tver Oblast, Russia.

References

Rural localities in Vesyegonsky District
Vesyegonsky Uyezd